Alcobaça is a municipality of Bahia, Brazil.

The municipality contains part of the Cassurubá Extractive Reserve, a  sustainable use conservation unit that protects an area of mangroves, river and sea where shellfish are harvested.
The Timbebas reef opposite Alcobaça is part of the  Abrolhos Marine National Park, a conservation unit created in 1983.

References

Populated coastal places in Bahia
Municipalities in Bahia